Bolehall Viaduct (formerly the Anker Viaduct), known locally as The 19 Arches is a  viaduct on the former Birmingham and Derby Junction Railway  line near Tamworth, Staffordshire, England now part of the Cross Country Route.

Construction

It was designed by Robert Stephenson and G. Bidder. The Birmingham and Derby Junction Railway issued tenders for the contract in May 1837  and the contracts were let in August 1837. It was built in rusticated ashlar stone with 19 arches to bridge the River Anker and was originally known as the Anker Viaduct. By February 1839 the construction was completed and the ballasting was being prepared for the permanent way. The first engine traversed the viaduct on 1 July 1839 and the first train on 6 July. Passenger services began on 12 August 1839.

See also
Listed buildings in Tamworth, Staffordshire

References

Grade II listed buildings in Staffordshire
Railway viaducts in Staffordshire
Bridges completed in 1839
Grade II listed bridges
Midland Railway